Tarek Ben Halim (4 December 1955 – 11 December 2009) was a Libyan investment banker, who left banking in 2000 to pursue charitable work and promote justice and democracy in the Arab World. In 2004, he founded Alfanar, the first Arab venture philanthropy organisation aiming to introduce a more effective and sustainable approach to development in the Arab region.

Early life 

Ben Halim was born on 4 December 1955, and spend his early years in Tripoli, Libya. His mother, Yusra Kanaan, came from Palestine, and his Libyan father, Mustafa Ahmed Ben Halim, served as Prime Minister of Libya from 1954 to 1957 and Libyan Ambassador to France from 1958 to 1960.

After the coup that brought Muammar Gaddafi to power in 1969, Ben Halim and his family were exiled and moved to Beirut before settling in London. He was educated at Atlantic College in Wales, and went on to study Finance at Warwick University before receiving an MBA from Harvard Business School.

Career 

He had a career in investment banking which included positions at JP Morgan, Credit Suisse First Boston and Goldman Sachs, where he became a managing director. In 2000, Ben Halim was responsible for the $2 billion flotation of Turkcell, which at the time was the largest ever emerging market IPO.

Exile from Libya taught Ben Halim early on about the perils of politics in the Arab world. Combined with the stories of his mother's flight from Palestine, it had a strong influence on his belief in justice and democracy as necessary tools for improving lives and communities in the region.

In a commentary piece published in The Los Angeles Times in February 2003, Ben Halim criticised "self-serving, unrepresentative governments that have, with few exceptions, ruled the Arab world since the 19th century". He hoped that changing the Iraqi regime in 2003 would cause similar changes in leadership across the region. He volunteered to work with the British forces and was appointed Deputy Director of private sector development with the Coalition Provisional Authority (CPA). However, he soon became frustrated with the CPA's approach. "He [Ben Halim] felt that the occupying force seemed more focused on quick gain rather than building a sustainable framework that would survive its departure." He resigned after only a few months.

Alfanar and investment banking 

Ben Halim's time in Iraq strengthened his determination to put into practice what Arab governments had long failed to do – improve livelihoods by responding to community needs. In 2004, he started Alfanar ("lighthouse" in Arabic) to promote a strong, vibrant, professional civil society in the Arab world. Alfanar aims to improve lives in disadvantaged communities throughout the region by fostering the growth of innovative, self-reliant organisations that effectively respond to pressing, long-term community needs.

Death 

Ben Halim died on 11 December 2009 aged 54 after being diagnosed with brain cancer 14 months earlier. He was married to Cynthia Oakes, a Princeton graduate and daughter of US journalist John Bertram Oakes. His obituary in The Guardian describes him as "a man of high principle and humour".

References

1955 births
2009 deaths
Libyan bankers
Libyan philanthropists
People educated at Atlantic College
Harvard Business School alumni
Deaths from brain cancer in England
Libyan emigrants to the United Kingdom
20th-century philanthropists
Libyan people of Palestinian descent